Africa Segreta (1969) (Translation: Secret Africa) is an Italian documentary film on French Equatorial Africa by Alfredo Castiglioni, Angelo Castiglioni and Guido Guerrasio. The film is narrated by Riccardo Cucciolla and explores a wide range of topics such as adult circumcision in the Bariba Tribe, the whipping of young Peuls, tattooing newborns in the Haussa tribe and blood rites conducted amongst ethnic groups in French Equatorial Africa.

References

External links

1969 films
Italian documentary films
1960s Italian-language films
1969 documentary films
1960s Italian films